Chez Ntemba is a chain of nightclubs owned by Congolese business man Augustin kayembeThe first Chez Ntemba nightclub was founded in 1992 in Lusaka.  there are 41 night clubs all across sub-Saharan Africa. In June 2016, Chez Ntemba, hosted a music concert in the Kabulonga suburb of Lusaka.

References 

Nightclubs